The Bukidnon Sports and Cultural Complex is a complex of sport facilities located at the city of Malaybalay, Bukidnon, under construction.

History
The 13-hectare complex was located in Brgy. Laguitas in Malaybalay. It was a joint project of Bukidnon Provincial Government, and Senator Juan Miguel Zubiri. It also features a fencing court, museum, dormitory, grandstand with track and oval, gymnasium, and an aquatic center. Once it was finished, the site will host several Palarong Pambansa qualifying and national games, and cultural performances. The Museum will also host several cultural events, and will also store some artifacts regarding the history of the province.

Facilities

Other facilities
Dormitory (1,536-bed capacity)
Open Parking Space with 325 car slots and 44 bus slots

See also
Malaybalay
List of football stadiums in the Philippines
List of indoor arenas in the Philippines

References

Sports complexes in the Philippines
Football venues in the Philippines
Basketball venues in the Philippines
Buildings and structures in Bukidnon